Joaquín Ignacio Gutiérrez Jara (born July 4, 2002), nicknamed Guti, is a Chilean footballer who currently plays as a defender for Chilean Primera División club Huachipato.

Club career
He was promoted to the Huachipato professional squad on 2020 and made his professional debut in a 2020 Primera División match against Deportes La Serena on September 25, 2020.

International career
He was in the Chile U17 squad at the 2019 South American U-17 Championship, where Chile was the runner-up, but he didn't make any appearance. Also, he represented Chile U20, as team captain, in a friendly tournament played in Teresópolis (Brazil) called Granja Comary International Tournament, playing all matches against Peru U20, Bolivia U20, and Brazil U20.

Later, he was called up to the first training microcycle of the Chile senior team on 2021.

References

External links
 
 Joaquín Gutiérrez at playmakerstats.com (English version of ceroacero.es)

Living people
2002 births
Chilean footballers
Chilean Primera División players
C.D. Huachipato footballers
Chile youth international footballers
Association football defenders
Chile under-20 international footballers